2018 Thai League 4 Northern Region is the 10th season of the League competition since its establishment in 2009. It is in the 4th tier of the Thai football league system.

Changes from last season

Promoted clubs

Promoted to the 2018 Thai League 3 Upper Region
 JL Chiangmai United
 Chiangrai City

Promoted from the 2017 Thailand Amateur League Northern Region
 Nakhon Mae Sot United

Relegated clubs

Relegated to the 2018 Thailand Amateur League Northern Region
 Paknampho NSRU

Relegated from the 2017 Thai League 3 Upper Region
 Singburi Bangrajun

Suspended clubs

 Chiangrai United B is suspended 1 year from 2017 Thai League 4 Northern Region get lower 7th.

Expansion clubs

 Tak City Club-licensing football club didn't pass to play 2018 Thai League 4 Northern Region. This team is banned 2 years and Relegated to 2020 Thailand Amateur League Northern Region.

Reserving clubs
 Sukhothai U-23 is Sukhothai Reserving this team which join Northern Region first time.

Teams

Stadium and locations

League table

Results by match played

Results 1st and 2nd match for each team

Results 3rd match for each team
In the third leg, the winner on head-to-head result of the first and the second leg will be home team. If head-to-head result are tie, must to find the home team from head-to-head goals different. If all of head-to-head still tie, must to find the home team from penalty kickoff on the end of each second leg match (This penalty kickoff don't bring to calculate points on league table, it's only the process to find the home team on third leg).

Season statistics

Top scorers
As of 26 August 2018.

Hat-tricks

Attendance

Attendance by home match played

Source: Thai League 4 
Note: Some error of T4 official match report 8 July 2018 (Uttaradit 4–1 Nakhon Mae Sot United).
 Some error of T4 official match report 15 July 2018 (Uttaradit 3–2 Nakhon Sawan).

See also
 2018 Thai League
 2018 Thai League 2
 2018 Thai League 3
 2018 Thai League 4
 2018 Thailand Amateur League
 2018 Thai FA Cup
 2018 Thai League Cup
 2018 Thailand Champions Cup

References

External links
Thai League 4
 http://www.thailandsusu.com/webboard/index.php?topic=388919.0
 https://web.archive.org/web/20180107103557/http://www.smmsport.com/news.php?category=74

4